The Alexander family was a prominent Croatian Jewish family from Zagreb. Alexander family ancestors moved to Zagreb from Güssing in Austria. For a century, the family played an important role in the economic and social life of Zagreb. Until 1941 and the establishment of the Independent State of Croatia the Alexanders were a large clan.

The great-grandparents of the Zagreb Alexanders were Samuel and Julija (née Neumann) Alexander, who had five sons and several daughters. Counting all of their deceased and still living members, including also the descendants of the female line, there were 224 Alexanders in seven generations. Many members of the family perished during the Holocaust. Today a few descendants bear the surname Alexander.

Members

Samuel David Alexander (1862–1943)
Šandor Alexander (1866–1929)
Viktor Alexander (1865–1934)
Oton Vinski (1877–1942)
Zdenko Vinski (1913–1989)
Ezel Alexander (1994–)

See also 
 Aleksander (Hasidic dynasty)

References

Bibliography

 

Jewish families
Croatian Jews
Austro-Hungarian Jews
Croatian Austro-Hungarians
Croatian people of Austrian-Jewish descent
Alexander family (Croatia)